Yuan Weiwei (born November 25, 1985, in Tianjin) is a Chinese footballer.

Club career
He started his professional career at Shandong Luneng playing as understudy to Wang Chao for the left-back position, making numerous appearances off the bench as his replacement. This would continue throughout the 2004 league season when Yuan Weiwei would play in twelve league games, three of which he actually started. For several more seasons, this would continue and Yuan Weiwei would be part of the squad that saw Shandong win the 2004 and 2006 league cups as well as winning the 2006 league title. It was however not until the 2008 season that saw the prominence of Yuan Weiwei establish himself as Shandong Luneng's first choice left-back when he overtook Wang Chao within the team by starting in twenty-one league games for them.

After a stellar 2013 season, Yuan transferred to fellow Chinese Super League side Tianjin Tedaon 1 February 2014. He was released at the end of 2016 season.

On 23 June 2017, Yuan joined China League Two side Yinchuan Helanshan.

On 9 March 2018, Yuan transferred to League Two side Hunan Billows.

International career
He made his senior debut for the national team in a friendly against Jordan in 2007, which China won 2–0. He was eligible to play for the Chinese under-23 national team that took part in the 2008 Summer Olympics where he played in two group games before being suspended for the third game, playing as first choice left-back for China.

Honours

Club
Shandong Luneng
Chinese Super League: 2006, 2008, 2010
Chinese FA Cup: 2004, 2006

References

External links
 
 Player stats at football-lineups website
 Sina club profile 

1985 births
Living people
Chinese footballers
Footballers from Tianjin
China international footballers
Footballers at the 2008 Summer Olympics
Olympic footballers of China
Shandong Taishan F.C. players
Tianjin Jinmen Tiger F.C. players
Hunan Billows players
Chinese Super League players
Association football defenders